Jeremiah James Sweeney   (September 4, 1857 – August 25, 1891) was a 19th-century professional baseball player. He played for the Kansas City Cowboys of the Union Association in 1884.

External links

1857 births
1891 deaths
Major League Baseball first basemen
Kansas City Cowboys (UA) players
19th-century baseball players
Quincy Quincys players
Lynn Lions players
Salem Fairies players
Baseball players from Massachusetts